Al Khari is the name of a settlement in Ras Al Khaimah, in the United Arab Emirates (UAE).

Villages in the United Arab Emirates
Populated places in the Emirate of Ras Al Khaimah